Melmoth the Wanderer is an 1820 Gothic novel by Irish playwright, novelist and clergyman Charles Maturin. The novel's titular character is a scholar who sold his soul to the devil in exchange for 150 extra years of life, and searches the world for someone who will take over the pact for him, in a manner reminiscent of the Wandering Jew.

The novel is composed of a series of nested stories-within-stories, gradually revealing the story of Melmoth's life. The novel offers social commentary on early-19th-century England, and denounces Roman Catholicism in favour of the virtues of Protestantism.

Synopsis
John Melmoth, a student in Dublin, visits his dying uncle. He finds a portrait of a mysterious ancestor called "Melmoth"; the portrait is dated 1646. At his uncle's funeral, John is told an old family story about a stranger called Stanton, who arrived looking for "Melmoth the Traveller" decades earlier.

A manuscript left by Stanton describes his first finding Melmoth laughing at the sight of two lovers who have been struck by lightning, and hearing of a wedding at which Melmoth was an uninvited guest: the bride died and the bridegroom went mad. Stanton's search for Melmoth is deemed to be madness and he is sent to a madhouse. Melmoth visits him there, and offers to free him, but Stanton refuses and escapes.

Following his uncle's wish, John burns the Melmoth portrait. He is visited by Melmoth in a dream, and later sees Melmoth laughing at a shipwreck. John tries to approach him, but slips and falls into the sea. He is saved from drowning by the sole survivor of the wreck, a Spaniard, Alonzo Monçada.

Alonzo Monçada tells his story (The Tale of the Spaniard), in which his family confines him to a monastery. He is mistreated by the monks, and his brother Juan arranges for him to escape with the help of a fellow monk, a parricide. The escape plan is a trap and Juan is killed. Monçada is taken to the prison of the Inquisition. There he is visited in his cell by Melmoth, who says he will help him escape. A fire breaks out, and in the confusion Monçada escapes. He meets a venerable Jewish scholar, Adonijah, who lives in a secret chamber decorated with the skeletons of his own family. In exchange for food and shelter, Adonijah compels Monçada to transcribe a manuscript for him: "the Tale of the Indian".

The Tale of the Indian tells of an island in the Indian Ocean which is rumored to be haunted by a white goddess named "Immalee". In reality, Immalee is a castaway who grew up alone on the island, isolated from humanity. She is visited by Melmoth, who tells her he comes from "the world that suffers". He tries to destroy her innocence, showing her the shortcomings of human societies and religions. She falls in love with him and begs him to stay with her, but he departs. Three years later, Immalee, now named Isidora, has been restored to her family in Madrid. Melmoth reappears and he and Isidora elope by night; he leads her to a remote chapel where they are married by an undead hermit.

Isidora's father encounters a stranger at an inn who tells him The Tale of Guzman's Family. Guzman is a wealthy Spanish merchant whose sister marries a poor German musician, Walberg. Guzman decides to make Walberg's family his heirs, but his will leaves everything to the church, and the family sinks into poverty; almost insane, Walberg decides to end their poverty by killing them all — but before he does so news arrives that the true will has been found and the family is saved. By this point in the story, Isidora's father has fallen asleep, and wakes to find the stranger at the inn replaced by Melmoth.

Melmoth tells him The Lovers' Tale, about a young woman in Yorkshire named Elinor, who is jilted at the altar and is subsequently tempted by Melmoth, but refuses his help.

The Tale of the Indian resumes: Isidora returns to her family, but she is pregnant with Melmoth's child. She has a presentiment that she will not live, and gets Melmoth to promise that the child will be raised as a Christian. Isidora's father finds a husband for her, but in the middle of the wedding celebrations, Melmoth tries to abduct Isidora. Her brother tries to intervene, and Melmoth kills him. Isidora falls senseless and Melmoth escapes. Isidora reveals that she is already married, to Melmoth. She gives birth, but she and her baby daughter are imprisoned by the Inquisition. The inquisitors threaten to take away the child, but find that it is already dead. Isidora, dying of grief, remembers her island paradise, and asks if "he" will be in the heavenly paradise.

Monçada and John are interrupted by the appearance of Melmoth himself. He confesses to them his purpose on Earth, that his extended life is almost over, and that he has never been successful in tempting another into damnation: "I have traversed the world in the search, and no one to gain that world, would lose his own soul!". Melmoth has a dream of his own damnation, and of the salvation of Stanton, Walberg, Elinor, Isidora and Monçada. He asks John and Monçada to leave him alone for his last few hours of mortal existence. They hear terrible sounds from the room, but when they enter, the room is empty. They follow Melmoth's tracks to the top of a cliff, and see his handkerchief on a crag below them. "Exchanging looks of silent and unutterable horror", they return home.

Reception
Honoré de Balzac wrote a follow-up story (Melmoth Reconciled) and considered Maturin's novel worthy of a place among Molière's Dom Juan, Goethe's Faust and Lord Byron's Manfred as one of the supreme icons of modern European literature.

Oscar Wilde, during his travels after release from prison, called himself Sebastian Melmoth, deriving this pseudonym from the title character in his great-uncle's novel and from Saint Sebastian.

Historian of English literature Walter Raleigh, in his book The English Novel (1905), stated "in Frankenstein and Melmoth the Wanderer, the Romantic orgy reached its height". The novel was described by H. P. Lovecraft as "an enormous stride in the evolution of the horror-tale", and Maurice Richardson also wrote an essay for Lilliput magazine praising Melmoth. Melmoth the Wanderer was cited by Karl Edward Wagner as one of the 13 best supernatural horror novels. Thomas M. Disch placed Melmoth the Wanderer at number four in his list of classic fantasy stories. Devendra P. Varma described Melmoth the Wanderer as "the crowning achievement of the Gothic Romance". Michael Moorcock has described Melmoth the Wanderer as "one of my favourites".

References in other works
 In Arturo Pérez-Reverte's The Club Dumas (the basis for Roman Polanski's film The Ninth Gate), Corso bumps into the mystery girl following him as she is reading Melmoth the Wanderer in the lobby of the hotel after seeing Fargas to review his copy of The Nine Doors of the Kingdom of Shadows.
 In Nathaniel Hawthorne's Fanshawe, one of the major characters is named "Doctor Melmoth".
 In Vladimir Nabokov's Lolita, Professor Humbert Humbert calls his automobile "Melmoth".
 In John Banville's 1989 novel The Book of Evidence, the narrator steals an automobile from a garage called "Melmoth's"; the make of the car is a Humber, an allusion to both Wilde and Nabokov.
 "Melmoth" is mentioned in Alexander Pushkin's Eugene Onegin.
 In Dave Sim's Cerebus comic book (issues 139–150), there's a writer named Oscar (homage to Oscar Wilde), who's registered under the name "Melmoth" at his hotel.
 In Grant Morrison's Seven Soldiers metaseries, Melmoth is an antagonist of Frankenstein.
 In Leonie Swann's Three Bags Full: A Sheep Detective Story, the mysterious sheep who has wandered the world and comes home to teach the flock what he has learned is named Melmoth.
 The mysterious financier Augustus Melmotte in Anthony Trollope's The Way We Live Now resembles Melmoth in more than name.
 In an 1842 review of Stanley Thorn, Edgar Allan Poe refers to "the devil in Melmoth" as an ineffectual seducer of souls.
 In letters H. P. Lovecraft addresses Donald Wandrei as Melmoth the Wandrei.
 A British magazine about surrealism was named Melmoth after the book. Melmoth was published from 1979–1981 and its contributors included George Melly and Ithell Colquhoun.
 In the British TV murder mystery series Midsomer Murders, the episode "Murder by Magic" (2015) included a mysterious country manor called Melmouth House, the home of an infamous rake-hell and paganist, Sir Henry Melmouth, who died, apparently, in a ritual pagan fire, hoping to be reborn from the ashes like the mythical phoenix.
 In Marty Feldman's movie In God We Tru$t (1980), Peter Boyle plays a con man and crooked street preacher named Dr. Sebastian Melmoth.
 Book title and many of its themes, inspired Anne Rice's Memnoch the Devil novel.
 Peter Garrison named the aircraft Garrison Melmoth after himself and Melmoth the Wanderer.
 Sarah Perry's third novel, Melmoth (2018), centres on a female variation of Maturin's character, damned (like Richard Wagner's Kundry in Parsifal) for denying the resurrection of Jesus Christ.
 In the Julio Cortázar novel, Hopscotch, a character denies being either a Maldodor or a Melmoth despite quite a bit of wandering about.

References

External links
 Melmoth the Wanderer, full and abridged editions online.
 Melmoth the Wanderer, full text online.
 

1820 British novels
Anti-Catholicism in Ireland
Anti-Catholic publications
Demon novels
Irish Gothic novels
Wandering Jew
1820s fantasy novels
19th-century Irish novels
Novels by Charles Maturin